Each team's roster consisted of at least 15 skaters (forwards and defencemen) and two goaltenders, and at most 25 skaters and three goaltenders. All 16 participating nations, through the confirmation of their respective national associations, had to submit a roster by the first IIHF directorate meeting.

Age and team as of 21 May 2021.

Group A

Belarus
A 27-player roster was announced on 11 May 2021. On 18 May, the final squad was revealed.

Head coach: Mikhail Zakharov

Czech Republic
A 29-player roster was announced on 7 May 2021.

Head coach: Filip Pešán

Denmark
The roster was announced on 7 May 2021.

Head coach: Heinz Ehlers

Great Britain
The roster was announced on 8 May 2021.

Head coach: Peter Russell

ROC
The roster was announced on 15 May 2021.

Head coach: Valeri Bragin

Slovakia
The roster was announced on 15 May 2021.

Head coach: Craig Ramsay

Sweden
The roster was announced on 16 May 2021.

Head coach: Johan Garpenlöv

Switzerland
The roster was announced on 16 May 2021.

Head coach: Patrick Fischer

Group B

Canada
The roster was announced on 14 May 2021.

Head coach: Gerard Gallant

Finland
The roster was announced on 15 May 2021.

Head coach: Jukka Jalonen

Germany
A 26-player roster was announced on 3 May 2021. It was 28 players on 10 May. On 15 May, the final squad was revealed.

Head coach: Toni Söderholm

Italy
The roster was announced on 15 May 2021.

Head coach: Greg Ireland

Kazakhstan
A 28-player roster was announced on 9 May 2021.

Head coach: Yuri Mikhailis

Latvia
The roster was announced on 15 May 2021.

Head coach: Bob Hartley

Norway
The roster was announced on 14 May 2021.

Head coach: Petter Thoresen

United States
A 26-player roster was announced on 13 May 2021.

Head coach: Jack Capuano

References

Rosters
IIHF World Championship rosters